Hugh I, Count of Rethel (1040 in Bourg – 1118 in Rethel) was a son of Count Manasses III of Rethel and his wife Judith.  He succeeded his father in 1065 as Count of Rethel.

Hugh married Melisende of Crécy, the daughter of Lord Guy I of Montlhéry. They had the following children:
 Manasses (1054-1115)
 Gervais (1056-1124), count of Rethel
 Baldwin II (1058-1131), king of Jerusalem (1118-1131), married Morphia of Melitene
 Matilda (b. 1060), married to Odo of Vitry, Count of Rethel
 Hodierna, married Heribrand III of Hierges
 Cecilia of Le Bourcq, married Roger of Salerno, prince-regent of Antioch
 Beatrix (Béatrice) married Leo I, Prince of Armenia

See also
The Houses of Montlhéry and Le Puiset

Notes

Sources

Counts of Rethel
1040 births
1118 deaths
11th-century French people
12th-century French people